Campaigns & Elections is a trade magazine covering political campaigns, focused on tools, tactics, and techniques of the political consulting profession. The magazine was founded by Stanley Foster Reed in 1980. It is headquartered in Arlington, Virginia.

The magazine is an exclusively digital publication. It was formerly published by Congressional Quarterly. The publication has an auxiliary website, The Political Pages, an annual directory of political firms and professionals. The magazine runs conferences and events focusing on political campaign skills and technology. The publication also has a Spanish language sister publication, Campaigns & Elections Mexico.

The publication presents the annual Reed Awards, first given in 2009, which award excellence in political campaigning, campaign management, political consulting, and political design.

See also
 Michael Wolff (journalist)

References

External links
 

1980 establishments in Virginia
Online magazines published in the United States
Political magazines published in the United States
Magazines established in 1980
Magazines published in Virginia
Bilingual magazines